The arrondissement of Senlis is an arrondissement of France in the Oise department in the Hauts-de-France region. It has 132 communes.

Composition

The communes of the arrondissement of Senlis, and their INSEE codes, are:

 Acy-en-Multien (60005)
 Antilly (60020)
 Apremont (60022)
 Auger-Saint-Vincent (60027)
 Aumont-en-Halatte (60028)
 Autheuil-en-Valois (60031)
 Avilly-Saint-Léonard (60033)
 Balagny-sur-Thérain (60044)
 Barbery (60045)
 Bargny (60046)
 Baron (60047)
 Beaurepaire (60056)
 Belle-Église (60060)
 Béthancourt-en-Valois (60066)
 Béthisy-Saint-Martin (60067)
 Béthisy-Saint-Pierre (60068)
 Betz (60069)
 Blaincourt-lès-Précy (60074)
 Boissy-Fresnoy (60079)
 Bonneuil-en-Valois (60083)
 Boran-sur-Oise (60086)
 Borest (60087)
 Bouillancy (60091)
 Boullarre (60092)
 Boursonne (60094)
 Brasseuse (60100)
 Brégy (60101)
 Chamant (60138)
 Chambly (60139)
 Chantilly (60141)
 La Chapelle-en-Serval (60142)
 Chèvreville (60148)
 Cires-lès-Mello (60155)
 Courteuil (60170)
 Coye-la-Forêt (60172)
 Cramoisy (60173)
 Creil (60175)
 Crépy-en-Valois (60176)
 Crouy-en-Thelle (60185)
 Cuvergnon (60190)
 Dieudonné (60197)
 Duvy (60203)
 Éméville (60207)
 Ercuis (60212)
 Ermenonville (60213)
 Étavigny (60224)
 Ève (60226)
 Feigneux (60231)
 Fleurines (60238)
 Fontaine-Chaalis (60241)
 Foulangues (60249)
 Fresnoy-en-Thelle (60259)
 Fresnoy-la-Rivière (60260)
 Fresnoy-le-Luat (60261)
 Gilocourt (60272)
 Glaignes (60274)
 Gondreville (60279)
 Gouvieux (60282)
 Ivors (60320)
 Lagny-le-Sec (60341)
 Lamorlaye (60346)
 Lévignen (60358)
 Mareuil-sur-Ourcq (60380)
 Marolles (60385)
 Maysel (60391)
 Mello (60393)
 Le Mesnil-en-Thelle (60398)
 Montagny-Sainte-Félicité (60413)
 Montataire (60414)
 Montépilloy (60415)
 Mont-l'Évêque (60421)
 Montlognon (60422)
 Morangles (60429)
 Morienval (60430)
 Mortefontaine (60432)
 Nanteuil-le-Haudouin (60446)
 Néry (60447)
 Neufchelles (60448)
 Neuilly-en-Thelle (60450)
 Nogent-sur-Oise (60463)
 Ognes (60473)
 Ormoy-le-Davien (60478)
 Ormoy-Villers (60479)
 Orrouy (60481)
 Orry-la-Ville (60482)
 Péroy-les-Gombries (60489)
 Plailly (60494)
 Le Plessis-Belleville (60500)
 Pontarmé (60505)
 Pontpoint (60508)
 Pont-Sainte-Maxence (60509)
 Précy-sur-Oise (60513)
 Puiseux-le-Hauberger (60517)
 Raray (60525)
 Réez-Fosse-Martin (60527)
 Rhuis (60536)
 Roberval (60541)
 Rocquemont (60543)
 Rosières (60546)
 Rosoy-en-Multien (60548)
 Rouville (60552)
 Rouvres-en-Multien (60554)
 Rully (60560)
 Russy-Bémont (60561)
 Saintines (60578)
 Saint-Leu-d'Esserent (60584)
 Saint-Maximin (60589)
 Saint-Vaast-de-Longmont (60600)
 Saint-Vaast-lès-Mello (60601)
 Senlis (60612)
 Séry-Magneval (60618)
 Silly-le-Long (60619)
 Thiers-sur-Thève (60631)
 Thiverny (60635)
 Thury-en-Valois (60637)
 Trumilly (60650)
 Ully-Saint-Georges (60651)
 Varinfroy (60656)
 Vauciennes (60658)
 Vaumoise (60661)
 Verberie (60667)
 Verneuil-en-Halatte (60670)
 Versigny (60671)
 Ver-sur-Launette (60666)
 Vez (60672)
 La Villeneuve-sous-Thury (60679)
 Villeneuve-sur-Verberie (60680)
 Villers-Saint-Frambourg-Ognon (60682)
 Villers-Saint-Genest (60683)
 Villers-Saint-Paul (60684)
 Villers-sous-Saint-Leu (60686)
 Vineuil-Saint-Firmin (60695)

History

The arrondissement of Senlis was created in 1800.

As a result of the reorganisation of the cantons of France which came into effect in 2015, the borders of the cantons are no longer related to the borders of the arrondissements. The cantons of the arrondissement of Senlis were, as of January 2015:

 Betz
 Chantilly
 Creil-Nogent-sur-Oise
 Creil-Sud
 Crépy-en-Valois
 Montataire
 Nanteuil-le-Haudouin
 Neuilly-en-Thelle
 Pont-Sainte-Maxence
 Senlis

References

Senlis